Rico Zulkarnain (born in Wales) is a Welsh futsal player.

References

Living people
Welsh footballers
1989 births
Association footballers not categorized by position
Taff's Well A.F.C. players